The Young Wild Things Tour was a four-band fall 2007 arena concert tour by Fall Out Boy with supporting acts Gym Class Heroes, Plain White T's, Cute Is What We Aim For, and Doug (from November 9 on).

This is Fall Out Boy's biggest tour to date, grossing over $30 million. The tour sold out in five hours, with over 1.5 million tickets sold. 

The tour was first announced on the Fall Out Boy website, but instead of the traditional method of announcing tour dates in the same release as the announcement of the tour itself, the bands chose an unusual method. Fans would text a certain number and would be given a code for their state/area. That code would then be entered on a website. After an unknown number of codes were entered, the tour date would be unlocked. The 31-date tour was only held in America, except for two Canadian dates. The tour began on October 18 and ran through December 2.

Inspired by Maurice Sendak's 1963 children's book Where the Wild Things Are, the concert tour included sets designed by artist Rob Dobi, containing images from the book. Fall Out Boy bassist Pete Wentz explained, "Where the Wild Things Are is a great narrative. It encapsulates pretty much every FOB song ever written: You know, tantrums and monster islands and all." "There's also a play on words of the young wild thing idea that everybody has with Hollywood and starlets right now."

Tour dates

References

2007 concert tours